Marvin Wood (November 28, 1900 – December 18, 1973) was an American football player in the National Football League. He played with the Kenosha Maroons during the 1924 NFL season.

References

People from Clark County, Indiana
Kenosha Maroons players
California Golden Bears football players
1900 births
1973 deaths